Sept haïkaï — esquisses japonaises (Seven Haiku: Japanese Sketches) is a composition for piano and small orchestra by Olivier Messiaen. It was published by Alphonse Leduc in 1966 and subsequently republished numerous times. It typically lasts about twenty minutes.

History
The set of Sept haïkaï were composed by Messiaen in 1962 after a trip to Japan while he was on honeymoon with his new second wife, Yvonne Loriod. They were influenced by the sounds of Indian rhythms, Gagaku, the music of the Noh theatre, and the birdcalls of Japan, which he had first incorporated in Chronochromie. Messiaen also used an underlying melodic-rhythmic structure similar to the isorhythms used by fourteenth century composers such as Vitry and Machaut.

Sept haïkaï are dedicated to Loriod, Pierre Boulez, Seiji Ozawa, Yoritsune Matsudaira, Sadao Bekku, Mitsuaki Hayama, Fumi Yamaguchi, and "to the landscapes, to the music and to all the birds of Japan". The suite premiered on 30 October 1963, conducted by Boulez, and with Loriod as the piano soloist, at Domaine Musical.

Instrumentation
The piece is scored for solo piano and an orchestra with the following instruments.

Woodwinds
 piccolo
 flute
 2 oboes
 cor anglais
 2 clarinets
 E clarinet
 bass clarinet
 2 bassoons
Brass
 trumpet
 trombone

Percussion
 triangle
 Chinese cymbals
 Turkish cymbals
 gongs
 bells
 crotales
 cencerros
 xylophone
 marimba
Strings
 8 violins

Movements

The work is composed of seven movements.

References

Notes

Compositions by Olivier Messiaen
1962 compositions
Compositions for piano and orchestra